Sespel (Śeśpĕl) is a rural locality (a village) and the administrative center of Sespelskoye Rural Settlement of Kanashsky District in the Chuvash Republic, Russia. Population: 567 (2006 est.).

Climate
The climate is moderately continental, with long cold winters and warm summers.

Infrastructure
The facilities in Sespel include a club, a library, a first-aid post, and a store.

Notable people
Şeşpĕl Mišši (1899–1922), poet

References

Rural localities in Chuvashia
Tsivilsky Uyezd